Javichthys kailolae is a species of pufferfish known only from the Bali Strait off Java in Indonesia. The species was described in 1985 and little else is known about it. It is so far the only known member of the monotypic genus Javichthys.

References 
 
Hardy, G. S. (1985). A new genus and species of pufferfish (Tetraodontidae) from Java. Bulletin of Marine Science 36(1) 145–49.

Tetraodontidae
Fish of Indonesia
Fish described in 1985